Palaeoryctidae or Palaeoryctoidea ("old/stony digger", from Greek: ὀρύκτης, oryctes) is an extinct group of relatively non-specialized non-placental eutherian mammals that lived in North America during the late Cretaceous and took part in the first placental evolutionary radiation together with other early mammals such as the leptictids. Some sources classified the Palaeoryctidae as a superfamily.

Description 
From a near-complete skull of the genus Palaeoryctes found in New Mexico, it is known that palaeoryctids were small, shrew-like insectivores with an elongated snout similar to that of the Lepticids.  However, in contrast to the latter, little is known about palaeoryctids postcranial anatomy (the skeleton without the skull).

Where the leptictids were short-lived, the paleoryctids seem to have been ancestors of Eocene species.  While their dental morphology still indicate a mostly insectivorous diet, it, to some extent, also relate to Eocene carnivores such as creodonts.

Taxonomy 
The relationship between this archaic group and other insectivorous mammals is uncertain. Palaeoryctidae was originally assigned to the now-abandoned grouping Insectivora by Sloan and Van Valen (1965) and more recently to Eutheria by Scott et al. (2002). Sister groups include: Kennalestidae, Nanocuridae, Pantolestidae, and Zalambdalestidae.

Generally speaking Palaeoryctidae has been used as a wastebasket taxon, but it is now considered obsolete; the only group of insectivorous mammals now considered valid is the order Eulipotyphla.

Notes

References

External links 
 
 

Cimolestans
Paleocene mammals
Eocene mammals
Late Cretaceous first appearances
Paleocene extinctions
Prehistoric mammal families